Counts of Luxburg  (German Graf von Luxburg) in the 18th Century also the family Girtanner of Luxburg, is originally the name of a St. Galler Council member that immigrated from Girtannerhof in the canton of Appenzell. The family became a Bavarian noble family in 1813.  Documentary records appear for the first time under the name Girtanner in the year in 1386.

History
Hereditary knighthood was acquired from St. Gallen as a general agent of the Lorraine salt works, the previously closed at Luxburg Egnach am Bodensee - March 1776 in Vienna. The family was elevated to Freiherr (baron) on 29 January 1779 in Vienna with same coat of arms as for Johann Girtanner Ritter of Luxburg. The family was again elevated to Reichsgraf (Count of the Empire) by Elector Karl Theodor of Bavaria Palatinate as imperial vicar in Munich 24 September 1790 for John's son Johann Friedrich Freiherr von Zweibrücken and Luxburg as “pfalzgräflich landgräflich” Hesse-Darmstadt urban Privy Council and Upper Schenk.

The family was enrolled in the Kingdom of Bavaria to the Count Class 11 January 1813 for the latter's son Friedrich Graf von Luxburg as Bavarian Royal Chamberlain and Ambassador to Kassel.

Coat of arms
By a silver St. Andrew's cross of red and blue diagonally quartered and topped with green heart shield, in a seated natural lynx, the oblique left bar of the St. Andrew's Cross has six top ousted gold studded brown Hifthörnern, the oblique right bar with six brown arrows one after the other with steel spikes and red feathers . Two helmets, on the right with blue and silver covers the lynx sitting on the left with red- silver covers a split of red and blue eagle wings, topped with a silver slant right bar is an arrow as imSchild . Sign High : Two resist seeing natural lynx . Banner below the coat of arms with the motto of Luxburg family Leo Lex Lux.

Castle Luxburg in Thurgau Switzerland
Castle Luxburg, in the Swiss Egnach, dates to Emperor Frederick III. towards the end of the 14th Century . It became the property of the patricians of Lindau. In the 17th Century the castle belonged to the Hall Wylern before Johann Girtanner bought the castle in 1776. On his elevation to the imperial knighthood (Reichsritter), he was given the name Johann Edler von Ritter Girtanner Luxburg after his possession. The castle is located in a park with an area of 9000 m2 near the mouth of the Wiilerbaches into Lake Constance. It is since 1980 one of four castles owned by the Foundation for Art, Culture and History of the Winterthur estate king Bruno Stefanini . [1]

Aschach Castle
In 1874 Friedrich Graf von Luxburg (1829-1905), acquired Aschach Castle near Bad Kissingen and made it the family home because the family had not yet a main residence. Luxburg loved art objects of all kinds and set Aschach Castle accordingly. In 1955, the family bequeathed the entire estate to the district of Lower Franconia. Today Aschach Castle can be visited with all annexes as Graf-Luxburg Museum.

Literature
Genealogical Handbook of the nobility, Adelslexikon Volume VIII, page 133, Volume 113 of the total row, CA Strong publishing house, Limburg (Lahn ) 1997, 
Genealogical Handbook of the nobility, Count's house band 6, band 77 of the total number, page 259, CA Strong publishing house, Limburg (Lahn) 1981
Ernst Heinrich Kneschke : New general German nobility - Lexicon, 1885, Volume 6, page 64 ( digitized )
Helene Walter churches : aristocrats. Life between tradition and modernity, 2000, page 73
Herbert Schultheis : Bad Bocklet - History of the districts and Aschach Großenbrach . Approx. 429 pages. Color and black and white pictures . Bad Neustadt a d Saale 1996.  .
Girtanner in the Historical Dictionary of Switzerland

External links
http://cronicasdeltanato.wordpress.com/la-invasion-nazi-a-venezuela/
http://www.geneall.net/D/per_page.php?id=1689202
http://www.geneall.net/D/per_page.php?id=1807120
https://web.archive.org/web/20131021220955/http://luxburgfoundation.com/index.html

References
1 High jumping ↑ Tageblatt St. Gallen of 13 October 2012: The Legacy of Luxburg, accessed on 16 October 2012

Luxburg
Bavaria
Lists of German nobility
Lists of medieval people